Kiran (Mubarak Ho Rishta Aaya Hai on Geo Entertainment) is a 2017 Pakistani television drama serial directed by Tehseen Khan, produced by Babar Javed, and written by Nasreen Nizami. The drama stars Marjan Fatima, Hiba Aziz and Munawar Saeed in lead roles, and first aired on 21 April 2017 on Geo Kahani, where it  aired twice a week on Saturday and Sunday at 7pm. The serial also aired on Geo Entertainment under the title Mubarak ho Rishta Aaya hai  on the same time-slot but later moved to Monday to Friday 4:30 P.M with half an hour episodes.

Plot
A beautiful young girl Kiran always dreamt of an ideal marital life in form of a warm-hearted husband and a caring bread winner for the family. The greatest irony of dream occurs when life makes Kiran figure that takes the responsibility on her shoulders. The wedding preparations of Kiran are in full swing and amidst of it her father suffers from a fatal heart attack. She takes a decision to postpone her marriage and sell the gold for his treatment, which makes the family-to-be upset. To her dismay, the father has a heart infection which requires him to stay back at the hospital. Kiran abandons her dreams, and steps her feet in job force. The fear of unknown takes a toll on her which results in a personality transformation. How will she cope with future challenges in her new role as a sole bread winner for her family?

Cast
Marjan Fatima as Kiran
Hiba Aziz as Guriya
Munawar Saeed as Afzal
Parveen Akbar as Kiran's Mami
Basit Faryad as Fawad
Ikram Abbasi as Ahmer
Nargis Rasheed as Salma
Furry Ali as Fatwa
Rana Major as Zaid
Tabrez Shah as Faraan
Farah Nadir as Surayyia
Mohammad Ali Khan as Hassan
Farhad Ali as Addan

References

2017 Pakistani television series debuts
2017 Pakistani television series endings
Pakistani drama television series
Urdu-language television shows